WMAY-FM (92.7 MHz) is a commercial radio station licensed to Taylorville, Illinois, and serving the Springfield metropolitan area.  It is owned by Mid-West Family Broadcasting.  The station has a news/talk radio format on weekdays and plays classic hits nights and weekends.

WMAY-FM has an effective radiated power (ERP) of 11,500 watts.  The radio studios and offices are on North Third Street in Riverton, Illinois.

Programming
Weekdays on WMAY-FM begin with "The WMAY Newsfeed," a local news and information show hosted by Greg Bishop.  Local talk shows are heard in late mornings with Mike Wennmacher and in afternoon drive time with Jim Leach.  The syndicated "Ramsey Show with Dave Ramsey" is carried in early afternoons.  Evenings and overnights feature "Hits and Headlines," a mix of classic hits and news updates from ABC News Radio and the WMAY newsroom.

Weekends feature programs on money, health, law, real estate, computers, guns and an hour devoted to the music of the Grateful Dead.  Some weekend shows are paid brokered programming.  The rest of the weekend is "Hits and Headlines."

History
It was 3,000-watt WTIM-FM, playing beautiful music and featuring local high school sports events. It was the FM counterpart to WTIM (AM 1410, now WIHM) which was a daytimer. From 1975 to 1983, the station was WEEE (known as "Triple E" and later "W-3-E") with a variety of contemporary music formats, starting as adult contemporary then changing to "Rock 'n' Gold" (an AC/oldies hybrid) and then to album oriented rock. As an AOR station, the station first began to attract an audience in the Springfield market and was drawing much of its advertising revenue from there.

WEEE was sold in 1984 and the new owners changed the format to country music as WTJY. The station was sold again two years later and the format became satellite-fed AC. In 1990, WTJY took on a dayparted format with AAA/Rock mix during the day and a hard-rock/Heavy Metal mix at night. The station also featured the "Todd & Joe morning show" with Todd Ellis and Joe Swank, both of whom went on to work at WKCM/WLME in Hawesville, KY/Tell City, Indiana after the station sale in 1993. The station also featured Rick Elliott music director and afternoon host, later left to become Operations Manager of WJVO/WJIL in Jacksonville, IL, and Shawn Balint, who went by the handle of "Doc Rock".

Ownership of WTIM and WTJY became separate in 1993 (thanks to deregulation making it possible for Springfield "clusters" to add a station), with WTJY going to Mid-West Family Broadcast Group to become part of the company's Springfield station cluster as WQLZ. The station also was granted a power increase to 11,500 watts and a tower relocation into Sangamon County to get city-grade coverage of Springfield without relinquishing city-grade coverage of Taylorville. Ellis was on the new WQLZ for a time and Balint remained with WTIM. 
Meanwhile, WTIM later gained a new FM sister to serve Taylorville in 94.3 WMKR, and moved to its current frequency of 97.3 in 1996 while a Catholic religious broadcaster took over the AM 1410 signal. 

During the 1990s, WQLZ was the only radio station in the Central Illinois area with live DJs 24 hours a day, featuring "Ray Lytle's Morning Disaster" hosted by Ray Lytle with his brother Bodine, as well as Jim the Photographer, Mikey, Shawn Balint (who returned to the frequency sometime in the decade), Rocky, Mychelle the Weather Babe, Brando and Rich, Marvin, Larz, and others. In 2006, Balint went on to the St. Louis market, Mikey left radio, and in November 2007, Jim the Photographer died in his home.

On August 24, 2015, WQLZ began temporarily simulcasting on WLCE, which became the new home for WQLZ on September 4. On that day, 92.7 began stunting with TV theme songs as "TV 93" and changed its call sign to WUSW-FM. On the 8th, 92.7 flipped to country as "92.7 US Country". The call sign WUSW was briefly moved to 1670 AM in Madison, WI, until WUSW-FM assumed the call sign on the 22nd.

On August 28, 2020, Midwest Family announced that WUSW would drop its country format and begin simulcasting WMAY on September 1. The addition of 92.7 expanded WMAY’s FM coverage to areas to the south and east of Springfield.  The station changed its call letters to WMAY-FM, effective February 10, 2021.

Previous logo

References

External links

History of 1410 AM and 92.7 FM in Taylorville

MAY-FM
News and talk radio stations in the United States
Radio stations established in 1967
1967 establishments in Illinois